XOXO: From Love and Anxiety in Real Time is the eighth studio album by American rock band The Maine and was released on July 9, 2021, through 8123 and Photo Finish Records.

Release 
On March 15, 2021, the band announced the album along with news that the lead single, "Sticky", would be released on March 19, 2021. The band preceded the release of the album with additional singles "April 7th", "Lips", and "Pretender". To celebrate the album's release, the band set up The XOXO Experience, a theater showcase which set the album's tracks to visuals in Tempe and premiered the song "High Forever" on Alt Nation on July 7, on July 8, orchestrated an XOXO pop-up shop on July 10 in Los Angeles, and held a livestream event known as Face Towards the Sun on July 11, also in Los Angeles. To support the album, the band will be going on tour in the fall in support of All Time Low.

Critical reception

The album received positive critical reception with Augusta Battoclette of Alternative Press stating that "...the group only further prove that they hardly ever miss when it comes to their music." idobi's Sam Devotta claimed that the band had "once again delivered an album that perfectly sums up what it means to be human." Her review regards the album as a "product of huge changes in their personal lives (weddings, babies, moving out of state)" as well as a record that allowed them "to explore, to bring in new inspirations and try something different, while still delivering the pop rock-infused anthems they’re known for."

Track listing

Personnel 
Per the XOXO: From Love and Anxiety in Real Time liner notes.

The Maine
 John O'Callaghan – vocals, guitar, piano
 Jared Monaco – lead guitar
 Kennedy Brock – rhythm guitar
 Garret Nickelsen – bass guitar, synths
 Pat Kirch – drums

Production
 John O'Callaghan & The Maine - Producer
 Matt Keller - Additional production and engineering
  Andrew Goldstein - Additional production on "Sticky"
 Colby Wedgeworth - Additional production on "April 7th" and "If Your Light Goes Out"
 Neal Avron - Mix engineer on tracks 1, 2, 4, and 6
 Dan Lancaster - Mix engineer on tracks 3, 5, 7, 8, 9, and 10

Artwork
 Rich Raun - Album art design and creative director
 Guadalupe Bustos - Photography
 Dirk Mai - Photography

Chart performance

References 

2021 albums
The Maine (band) albums